Walnut is an unincorporated community in Macon County, in the U.S. state of Missouri.

History
A post office called Walnut was established in 1882, and remained in operation until 1914. The community took its name from nearby Walnut Creek.

References

Unincorporated communities in Macon County, Missouri
Unincorporated communities in Missouri